Allahabad-e Sofla or Allahabad-e Pain  may refer to:
 Allahabad-e Sofla, Kerman
 Allahabad-e Sofla, North Khorasan